The 1954 NBA playoffs was the postseason tournament of the National Basketball Association's 1953–54 season. The tournament concluded with the Western Conference champion Minneapolis Lakers defeating the Eastern Conference champion Syracuse Nationals 4 games to 3 in the NBA Finals.

For the Lakers, it was their third straight NBA title, and fifth in the last six years.

With the folding of the Indianapolis Olympians after the previous year's playoffs, leaving the NBA with nine teams, they resorted to a round-robin playoff format in 1954 for the only time in league history.

Although the Minneapolis Lakers, Fort Wayne Pistons, Rochester Royals and Syracuse Nationals all play in different cities now (Los Angeles, Detroit, Sacramento and Philadelphia respectively), this is the earliest NBA playoff in which every team that participated still exists today.

Bracket

Division Round Robin Semifinals
Within each division, the top three teams in the season standings played a double round robin, comprising one home game in each city for each pair of teams, in order to eliminate one of the three participants. A three-way tie with two wins each would have secured home-court advantage in the Division Finals for New York or Minneapolis, who finished first in the season standings, against an opponent to be determined by one further game played with the season runner-up as host. In the event, neither round-robin generated even a two-way tie, so no seventh game was required in either Division. Two of three teams (shaded green) advanced to the Division Finals. The second game between Minneapolis and Rochester—the sixth and final Western Division game scheduled—was not played because both teams had qualified for the Division Final and Minneapolis had secured home-court advantage in that series. The sixth and final Eastern Division game scheduled, Boston at Syracuse, was played because home-court advantage in their subsequent Division Final hadn't been determined. Both teams had won 42 season games and Boston had won by coin flip the edge in case of a tie in the round-robin stage.

Eastern Division Round Robin Semifinals

(1) New York Knicks, (2) Boston Celtics, (3) Syracuse Nationals

 With the Knicks having already been mathematically eliminated from contention, this is the only playoff game to date in which one team had nothing to play for. This contest only contributed towards who would have home-court advantage in the Division Finals between the Nationals and Celtics.

This was the fourth playoff meeting between the Celtics and Knicks, with the Knicks winning two of the first three meetings.

This was the second playoff meeting between the Celtics and Nationals, with the Celtics winning the first meeting.

This was the fourth playoff meeting between the Knicks and Nationals, with the Knicks winning two of the first three meetings.

Western Division Round Robin Semifinals

(1) Minneapolis Lakers, (2) Rochester Royals, (3) Fort Wayne Pistons

 The contest originally scheduled for March 23 (Minneapolis @ Rochester) was not played due to first place finishers owning a tiebreaker, and thus the final positions in the round-robin were already locked in.

This was the fourth playoff meeting between the Lakers and Royals, with the Lakers winning two of the first three meetings.

This was the fifth playoff meeting between the Royals and Pistons, with both teams splitting the first four meetings.

This was the third playoff meeting between the Pistons and Lakers, with the Lakers winning the first two meetings.

Division Finals

Eastern Division Finals

(1) Syracuse Nationals vs. (2) Boston Celtics

This was the third playoff meeting between these two teams following the round-robin, with both teams splitting the first two meetings.

Western Division Finals

(1) Minneapolis Lakers vs. (2) Rochester Royals

This was the fifth playoff meeting between these two teams following the round-robin, with the Lakers winning three of the first four meetings.

NBA Finals: (W1) Minneapolis Lakers vs. (E1) Syracuse Nationals

 Paul Seymour hits the game-winner from 43 feet with 7 seconds left.

This was the second playoff meeting between these two teams, with the Lakers winning the first meeting.

References

External links
1954 NBA Playoffs Summary at Basketball-Reference.com

National Basketball Association playoffs
Playoffs

fi:NBA-kausi 1953–1954#Pudotuspelit